

League tables

Group I

Group II

Group III

Group IV

Group V

Group VI

Group VII

Group VIII

Group IX

Group X

Group XI

Group XII

Group XIII

Group XIV

Promotion playoff

First round

Final Round

Season records
 Most wins: 30, Plasencia.
 Most draws: 21, Arenas de Getxo.
 Most losses: 32, Salas.
 Most goals for: 130, Plasencia.
 Most goals against: 123, Racing de Ceuta.
 Most points: 66, Plasencia.
 Fewest wins: 2, Olot and Salas.
 Fewest draws: 3, Lloret, Puerto de la Cruz and Atlético Muleño.
 Fewest losses: 2, Burgos, Mensajero, Eldense and Plasencia.
 Fewest goals for: 18, Victoria.
 Fewest goals against: 13, Burgos.
 Fewest points: 8, Salas.

Notes

External links
www.rsssf.com
www.futbolme.com

Tercera División seasons
4
Spain